is a Japanese former professional footballer who played as a midfielder.

Early and personal life
Zaizen was born in Muroran on 19 October 1976. His elder brother Keiichi is also a former footballer.

Club career
He joined Verdy Kawasaki from their youth team in 1995. In 1996, he moved to La Liga club Logroñés on loan. However he could not play in the match for injury and returned to Japan. He debuted in 1998 J.League Cup. Through Croatian club Rijeka, he joined J2 League club Vegalta Sendai in 1999. He played as offensive midfielder in many matches. In 2001, he became a regular player and the club was promoted to J1 League first time in the club history. From 2002, although his opportunity to play decreased and the club was relegated J2 League end of 2003 season, he played as regular player again from 2004. He moved to Montedio Yamagata in 2006. In 2008, although his opportunity to play decreased, the club was promoted to J1 League first time in the club history. In 2010, he moved to Thailand and played for Muangthong United (2010) and BEC Tero Sasana (2011). He announced his retirement in January 2012.

National team career
In August 1993, Zaizen was part of the Japanese under-17 team at the 1993 U-17 World Championship, playing in all 4 matches. He was selected a member of the 'All Star' team at the tournament.

Club statistics

References

External links

Guardian Stats Centre

1976 births
Living people
Association football people from Hokkaido
Japanese footballers
Association football midfielders
Tokyo Verdy players
CD Logroñés footballers
HNK Rijeka players
Vegalta Sendai players
Montedio Yamagata players
Nobuyuki Zaizen
Nobuyuki Zaizen
J1 League players
J2 League players
Nobuyuki Zaizen
Japanese expatriate footballers
Japanese expatriate sportspeople in Spain
Japanese expatriate sportspeople in Croatia
Japanese expatriate sportspeople in Thailand
Expatriate footballers in Spain
Expatriate footballers in Croatia
Expatriate footballers in Thailand
Japan youth international footballers
People from Muroran, Hokkaido